Placenames in New Zealand derive largely from British and Māori origins. An overview of naming practices can be found at New Zealand place names.

A 
 Akaroa – Kāi Tahu Māori for "Long Harbour", equivalent to Whangaroa
 Albany (Māori: Ōkahukura) – named after Albany in Australia, as they were both fruit-growing areas
 Albert Town – named after Prince Albert of Saxe-Coburg and Gotha
 Alexandra (Manuherikia or Areketanara) – named after Alexandra of Denmark, the wife of King Edward VII
 Aoraki / Mount Cook – this Kāi Tahu Māori name is often glossed as "Cloud Piercer", but literally it consists of ao "cloud" and raki "sky". The English component is in honour of Captain James Cook
 Aotearoa – the common Māori name for New Zealand since the early 20th century; previously a Māori name for the North Island. Usually glossed as Land of the Long White Cloud. From ao: cloud, tea: white, roa: long
 Aramoana – Māori for "pathway to (or beside) the sea"
 Auckland (Tāmaki Makaurau) – in honour of George Eden, 1st Earl of Auckland, a patron of William Hobson

B 
 Balclutha (Iwikatea) – from Scottish Gaelic "Baile Chluaidh" town on the Clyde
 Balfour – named after either a Waimea Company employee or a local surveyor
 Barrett Reef (Tangihanga-a-Kupe) – named after Richard Barrett, a 19th-century whaler and trader
 Birdling's Flat (Te Mata Hapuku) – named for the first Pākehā family to farm in the area, the Birdling family
 Blackball – named after the Black Ball Shipping Line, which leased land in the area for coal mining
 Brighton – named after Brighton, England
 Burkes Pass – named after Michael John Burke, who discovered the pass in 1855
 Burnham – named after Burnham Beeches, Buckinghamshire

C 
 Canterbury (Waitaha) – after the city and archdiocese of Canterbury in England
 Cape Farewell – named due to being the last part of New Zealand seen by Captain James Cook and his crew in 1770 before beginning their homeward voyage
 Cape Kidnappers / Te Kauwae-a-Māui – named after an attempt by local Māori to abduct one of the crew of Capt. James Cook's ship Endeavour in 1769
 Carterton (Taratahi) – named after Charles Carter, settler advocate and provincial politician
 Christchurch (Ōtautahi) – after Christ Church, one of the colleges of the University of Oxford in England
 Clive – named after Robert Clive
 Clutha River / Mata-Au – from "Cluaidh", the Scottish Gaelic for the Clyde
Inch Clutha, as above, "inch" deriving from the Gaelic word "innis', meaning island
 Coalgate – named as the "gateway" to coalfields in inland Canterbury
 Collingwood – after Admiral Cuthbert Collingwood
 Cook Strait (Te Moana-o-Raukawa) – in honour of Captain James Cook
 Coonoor – named after Coonoor, India
 Coromandel, Originally named HMS Malabar
 Cromwell (Tīrau) – origin unknown, possibly after Oliver Cromwell
 Crooked River – named for its erratic, meandering path across plains near Lake Brunner

D 
 Dannevirke (Taniwaka) – named after the Danevirke, a defensive formation constructed across the neck of the Jutland Peninsula during the Viking Age. Its name means "Danes' works" in the Danish language
 Dargaville (Takiwira) – named after timber merchant and politician Joseph McMullen Dargaville (1837–1896)
 Douglas (Oruru) – named after a member of the Crown's surveying party
 Dunedin (Ōtepoti) – from the Scottish Gaelic name for Edinburgh, "Dùn Èideann"

E 
 Eyreton and West Eyreton – for Edward John Eyre, who acted as lieutenant governor of the South Island when it was known as New Munster

F 
 Fairlie – named after Fairlie, North Ayrshire, Scotland
 Featherston (Paetūmōkai) – named after Isaac Featherston, who was a first Superintendent of Wellington Province
 Foveaux Strait (Te Ara a Kiwa) – named after Joseph Foveaux, who was Lieutenant-Governor of New South Wales when the strait was discovered in 1804

G 
 Gisborne (Turanganui-a-Kiwa) – named after William Gisborne (Maori version is the standing place of Kiwa)
 Gladstone – named after British Prime Minister William Ewart Gladstone
 Glenorchy – likely after Glen Orchy, Scotland
 Gore (Maruawai) – for an early Governor of New Zealand, Sir Thomas Gore Browne
 Grey River / Māwheranui (Māwhera) and Greytown (Te Hupenu) – named after politician George Edward Grey
 Greymouth (Māwhera) – named for its location at the mouth of the Grey River

H 
 Haast – named after Julius von Haast, a German geologist knighted for his services to New Zealand geology
 Hamilton (Kirikiriroa) – renamed after Captain John Fane Charles Hamilton, commander of HMS Esk, who was killed in the battle of Gate Pa, Tauranga
 Hampden – named after English politician John Hampden
 Hastings (Heretaunga) – named after Englishman Warren Hastings the first Governor-General of Bengal
 Hauraki Gulf / Tīkapa Moana – Māori for north wind
 Hawke's Bay (Te Matau-a-Māui) – in honour of Edward Hawke, 1st Baron Hawke of Towton

I 
 Inchbonnie – is a hybrid of Lowland Scots, bonnie meaning "pretty" and Scottish Gaelic innis meaning island, often anglicised as "Inch".
 Invercargill (Waihōpai) – from Scottish Gaelic inbhir anglicised "Inver" meaning a confluence and William Cargill, founder of Otago.

K 
 Kaikohe – combination of food (kai), and the Kohekohe native trees on Kaikohe Hill, (Tokareireia)
 Kerikeri – not definitively known. See Kerikeri#Origins and naming for several possibilities
 King Country (Te Rohe Pōtae) – district where the Māori King Movement led by King Tawhiao flourished in the 1860s
 Kirwee – named after Karwi, India by retired British Army colonel De Renzie Brett
 Kohimarama – properly 'Kohimaramara' – to gather up (kohi) the scraps or chips (maramara)

L 
 Lake Hayes (Te Whaka-ata a Haki-te-kura) – originally Hays Lake and named for D. Hay, who came to the area looking for sheep country in 1859
 Lake Te Anau – named after Te Ana-au Caves, "the cave of swirling water"
 Lake Waihola – from the southern Māori form of the words wai hora, meaning "spread-out waters"
 Levin (Taitoko) – from a director of the Wellington and Manawatu Railway Company, which created the town to service its railway

M 
 Macetown – named after its founders, the brothers Charles, Harry, and John Mace
 Mackenzie Basin (or Mackenzie Country) – named by and after James Mackenzie, a Scottish Gaelic shepherd and sheep thief who herded his stolen flocks to the largely unpopulated basin
 Manukau – may mean "wading birds", although it has been suggested that the harbour was originally named Mānuka, after a native tree
 Martinborough (Wharekaka) – after the town's founder, John Martin
 Masterton (Whakaoriori) – after local pioneer Joseph Masters
 Maungati – Māori for "cabbage-tree mountain"
 Milford Sound / Piopiotahi – named after Milford Haven, Wales. The Māori name, Piopiotahi, means "first native thrush"
 Millers Flat – named after an early European settler of the area, Walter Miller

N 
 Napier (Ahuriri) – after Sir Charles James Napier
 Naseby, New Zealand – named after Naseby, England
 Nelson (Whakatū) – in honour of Horatio Nelson, 1st Viscount Nelson
 New Brighton – named after New Brighton, northern England
 New Plymouth (Ngāmotu) – named after Plymouth in England

O 
 Ophir – after gold was discovered in the area, it was named after where King Solomon obtained the gold to sheath the Temple in Jerusalem
 Otago – Anglicised from the Māori name Ōtākou, a kāinga (village) east of present-day Otago Harbour, meaning "place of red ochre"
 Otematata – Māori for "place of good flint"

P 
 Paerau – Māori for "hundred ridges"
 Palmerston and Palmerston North – named after Henry John Temple, 3rd Viscount Palmerston twice Prime Minister of the United Kingdom, the suffix 'North' added to the latter which is the younger of the two settlements
 Papatoetoe – papa means a flat, and toetoe is a native grass (similar to pampas grass)
 Mount Earnslaw / Pikirakatahi – named after Earnslaw village in the parish of Eccles, Berwickshire, Scotland
 Plimmerton – from John Plimmer, Wellington pioneer, director of the Wellington and Manawatu Railway Company, which created the seaside resort to help boost its railway; central Wellington has Plimmer's Steps
 Porirua –  Possibly a variant of "Pari-rua" ("two tides"), a reference to the two arms of the Porirua Harbour
 Pukerua Bay – puke: hill, rua: two – location is on a saddle between two hills

Q 
 Queenstown (Tāhuna) – most probably named after a small town called The Cove in Ireland which was renamed to Queenstown in honour of Queen Victoria in 1850.

R 
 Rakiura (Stewart Island) – raki: sky, ura: red – thought to be a reference to the Aurora Australis and unusual sunsets at these latitudes
 Ranfurly – named after Uchter Knox, 5th Earl of Ranfurly, former Governor-General of New Zealand
 Raumati – Māori for summer

S 
 Selwyn River / Waikirikiri - named after Bishop Selwyn. Māori portion translates as "gravelly water"
 Sinclair Wetlands – named after local farmer Horace Sinclair

T 
 Tasman – district named from the bay name, in honour of Dutchman Abel Tasman, commander of first European ship to sight the country. Also name of Mount Tasman, Tasman Glacier and Tasman National Park
 Taumatawhakatangihangakoauauotamateapokaiwhenuakitanatahu "the summit where Tamatea, who travelled about the land, played the flute to his beloved." This hill in Hawke's Bay is credited by The Guinness Book of World Records with having the longest place name in the world
 Tauranga – a sheltered anchorage for waka, (canoes)
 Tauweru River – Māori for "hanging in clusters"; the town of Tauweru is named after the river
 Te Awamutu – Māori for "the river's end"
 Te Raekaihau Point – Te Rae-kai-hau – The literal meaning of the name is ‘the headland that eats the wind’ (see Best, 8, Pt.5, p. 174)
 Te Waipounamu (the South Island) – the greenstone water or 'the water of greenstone' where 'wai' can also refer to rivers or streams or other bodies of water. It has been surmised that the name evolved from Te Wahi Pounamu, meaning the greenstone place
 Te Whiti o Tū – Māori for "Tū's crossing"
 Timaru – the Māori Language Commission renders this as Te Tihi-o-Maru, 'the peak of Maru'. Others have suggested that it derives from te maru, "place of shelter", or from tī, "cabbage tree", and maru, "shady"
 Tiniroto – Māori for "many lakes"

W 
 Waiheke Island – Waiheke means cascading or ebbing water
 Waikanae – Māori for "the waters of the grey mullet"
 Waikato, Waikato River – Māori for "flowing water"
 Wainuiomata – "wai": water, river; "nui": big; "o Mata": of Mata. Mata's big stream
 Waipori River – presumably from Māori wai, "water", and pōuri, "dark"
 Whangarei – whanga: harbour, rei: cherished possession
 Whitianga – 'crossing' or 'ford', from 'Te Whitianga-a-Kupe', Kupe's crossing place
 Wellington (Te Whanganui-a-Tara) – in honour of Arthur Wellesley, 1st Duke of Wellington
 Whitby – from the town of Whitby in Yorkshire England, home of James Cook
 Whitecliffs – named after terraced cliffs above the Selwyn River / Waikirikiri

Thomson's Barnyard
Many of the locations in the southern South Island of New Zealand, especially those in Central Otago and the Maniototo, were named by John Turnbull Thomson, who had surveyed the area in the late 1850s. Many of these placenames are of Northumbrian origin, as was Thomson himself.

There is a widespread, probably apocryphal, belief that the naming of many places was through a disagreement with the New Zealand surveying authorities. It has long been suggested that Thomson originally intended to give either classical or traditional Māori names to many places, but these names were refused. In response, Thomson gave prosaic Northumbrian names to them, often simply in the form of a Northumbrian dialectic name for an animal The Maniototo region around the town of Ranfurly is rife with such names as Kyeburn, Gimmerburn, Hoggetburn, and Wedderburn as a result. Ranfurly itself was originally called "Eweburn". The area is still occasionally referred to as "Thomson's Barnyard" or the "Farmyard Patch".

External links and sources

 Land Information NZ (LINZ) An authoritative list of New Zealand placenames, used for NZ government maps, is available in various forms. The list does not cover their meanings.
 NZ Geographic Board Nga Pou Taunaha Aotearoa – Free download of 55,000 New Zealand placenames. Note: Special care is required, for instance the geographic coordinates are NOT the centroid of the placename, they are the lower left corner of the original label scan from the 260 series maps (1:50 000 Topographic hard copy).
 

New Zealand
Place names